Euhrychiopsis is a weevil genus in the tribe Phytobiini.

References

External links 

 bugguide.net

Baridinae genera